Piechota is a Polish-language surname. Two possible etymologies are suggested. One is the actual noun piechota in its various historical meanings. Another is a derivative of the diminutive form "Piech" from given names Pietr, Piotr, etc. 

Notable people with the surname include:

Al Piechota (1914–1996), American baseball player
Jacek Piechota (born 1959), Polish politician
Oskar Piechota (born 1990), Polish mixed martial artist
Paulina Piechota (born 1999), Polish swimmer
Sławomir Jan Piechota (born 1960), Polish politician

See also
Piechocki

References

Polish-language surnames